Allen Henry William Herbert (20 October 1852 – 14 September 1897) was an English cricketer during the 1870s.

Herbert was born at Dartford in Kent in 1852, the son of Frederick and Bessie Newenham Herbert (née Stuart). His father was a Commander in the Royal Navy and Herbert was educated at the Royal Naval School at New Cross. His father died in 1868 and by the 1871 census he was living with his widowed mother at Saffron Walden in Essex.

All 11 of Herbert's first-class cricket matches were played between 1872 and 1876. He played eight times in first-class matches for MCC, making his first-class debut for the club in 1872, scoring a half-century against Surrey. This proved to be the only time he passed 50 runs in a first-class match; he scored a total of 239 runs at a batting average of 14.09 runs per innings. He made one appearance each for Kent and Middlesex County Cricket Clubs and another for the Gentlemen of the South side. In non-first-class cricket he played once for Essex County Cricket Club in 1872 and regularly for MCC during the period, scoring a century against the Royal Artillery in 1875 at Lord's.

By 1881 Herbert was working as a clerk at Hoare's Bank and lived in Belgravia in London. His elder brother, St Leger Herbert, was a soldier and journalist who died during the Mahdist War in 1885 in Mahdist Sudan. Herbert himself died in Belgravia in 1897 aged 44.

References

External links

1852 births
1897 deaths
English cricketers
Kent cricketers
Middlesex cricketers
Marylebone Cricket Club cricketers
Gentlemen of the South cricketers